Nataly Michel (born 9 July 1990) is a Mexican fencer. She competed in the women's foil event at the 2016 Summer Olympics.

References

External links
 

1990 births
Living people
Mexican male foil fencers
Olympic fencers of Mexico
Fencers at the 2016 Summer Olympics
Place of birth missing (living people)
Pan American Games medalists in fencing
Pan American Games bronze medalists for Mexico
Fencers at the 2011 Pan American Games
Central American and Caribbean Games bronze medalists for Mexico
Central American and Caribbean Games silver medalists for Mexico
Competitors at the 2010 Central American and Caribbean Games
Competitors at the 2014 Central American and Caribbean Games
Competitors at the 2018 Central American and Caribbean Games
Central American and Caribbean Games medalists in fencing
Medalists at the 2011 Pan American Games
21st-century Mexican people